The Aggression (released in West Germany as  and in France as ) is a 1987 West German film. It is a Heimatfilm. The plot centers around the attempted rape of pharmacist Ilse Trapmann, portrayed by Pascale Petit. The film takes the controversial stance that many West Germans have a latent desire to exert violence, despite the country's appearance to the contrary.

Cast
Pascale Petit

Claude-Oliver Rudolph
András Fricsay
Lambert Hamel
Henry van Lyck
Franz Böhm

Ernst Weiner
Mady Rahl

Anna Lange

Else Quecke
Claus-Dieter Reents

Reiner Scheibe
Ingrid Schoelderle
Hansi Thoms-Evelt

Chriatian Weiner

References

External links

1987 thriller films
German thriller films
West German films
Films based on German novels
1980s German films